Landesbank Berlin Holding (formerly Bankgesellschaft Berlin) is a large commercial bank based in Berlin, Germany. It is the holding company of the Berliner Sparkasse and Landesbank. In 2007, LBB was taken over by the  Deutscher Sparkassen- und Giroverband (DSGV). Berlin was forced to sell its stake by the European Commission as a condition of permitting the bailout of the then Bankgesellschaft Berlin, which had gotten into difficulties due to a real-estate scandal. In 2010, a net profit of EUR 317 million was reported.

References

External links

Official website

Landesbanks
Companies based in Berlin
Companies formerly in the MDAX
German companies established in 2005
Banks established in 2005